The Karl Malone Power Forward of the Year Award is an annual basketball award given by the Naismith Memorial Basketball Hall of Fame to the top men's collegiate power forward. Following  the success of the Bob Cousy Award which had been awarded since 2004, the award was one of four new awards (along with the Jerry West Award, Julius Erving Award and Kareem Abdul-Jabbar Award) created as part of the inaugural College Basketball Awards show in 2015. It is named after 14-time NBA All-Star, 11-time All-NBA First Team player Karl Malone. The inaugural winner was Montrezl Harrell.

Winners

Winners by school

References

External links
Official website

Awards established in 2015
College basketball trophies and awards in the United States